Euproctis fulvipuncta is a moth of the family Erebidae first described by George Hampson in 1893. It is found in India and Sri Lanka.

It was described by Hampson as white with orange spots, with brown antennas.

The caterpillar is known to feed on Neolitsea zeylanica.

References

Moths of Asia
Moths described in 1893